Shiwani Saini (born 31 December 1988) is an Indian actress and model who appears in Hindi and Punjabi language films. She made her debut with the Punjabi film Happy Go Lucky.

Early life 
Saini has previously worked as a fashion designer. Beyond acting, Saini is known to have a passion for biking.

Career 
Saini made her film debut in the Harry Baweja's Punjabi language film Happy Go Lucky. Subsequently, she was selected for the role of Sarabjit's elder daughter, Swapan, in the Hindi language biographical drama film Sarabjit alongside Aishwarya Rai Bachchan Randeep Hooda and Richa Chadha (2016).

She has worked in the Hollywood film 5 Weddings as Devika; with Nargis Fakhri and Raj Kumar Rao. Next she was seen in Hindi movie Jai Mummy Di produced by LUV Films released in 2020. Next, she will be seen in Punjabi film Ikko Mikke with Satinder Sartaaj and Aditi Sharma, worldwide releasing on 13 March 2020.

Filmography

References

External links

1988 births
Living people
Actresses in Hindi cinema
Actresses in Punjabi cinema
Indian film actresses